Consequence may refer to:

 Logical consequence, also known as a consequence relation, or entailment
 In operant conditioning, a result of some behavior
 Consequentialism, a theory in philosophy in which the morality of an act is determined by its effects
 Unintended consequences
 In logic, a consequent is the second half of a hypothetical proposition or consequences
 Consequent (music), the second half of a period (music)

Games
 Consequences (game), a parlour game

Fiction
 Consequences (novel), a 1919 novel by E. M. Delafield
 "Consequences" (Kipling story), an 1888 short story by Rudyard Kipling
 "Consequences" (Cather story), a 1915 short story by Willa Cather

Film and TV
 Die Konsequenz (English: The Consequence), a 1977 West German film
 Anjaam (English: Consequence), a 1994 Hindi film
 Anjaam (1940 film), an earlier Hindi film of the same name
 Consequence (film), a 2003 action thriller film starring Armand Assante
 Consequences (1918 film), a 1918 British silent comedy film 
 Consequences (2018 film), a 2018 Slovenian drama film 
 Consequences (CSI: NY)
 "Consequences" (Buffy the Vampire Slayer), a 1999 episode of Buffy the Vampire Slayer
 Consequences (8 Simple Rules episode)

Music
 Consequence (rapper) (born 1977), American rapper from Queens, NY
 Consequence (publication), formerly Consequence of Sound, a music website

Albums
 Consequence (album), a 2005 album by jazz saxophonist Jackie McLean
 Consequences (New York Contemporary Five album), 1963
 Consequences (Dave Burrell album), 2006
 ConSequences (Raphe Malik album), 1999
 Consequences (Endwell album)
 Consequences (Godley & Creme album), 1977
 Consequences (The Missionary Position album), 2012
 Consequences (Peter Hammill album), 2012
 Consequences (Joan Armatrading album), 2021

Songs
 "The Consequence", a song by You Me At Six, from the album Hold Me Down
 "Consequences" (song) by Camila Cabello, from her eponymous album Camila (2018)
 Consequence, a song by German band The Notwist from the 2002 album Neon Golden